The Salzau is a stream, roughly  long, in the district of Plön in the North German state of Schleswig-Holstein.

Course
Together with the Mühlenau it is one of the two tailstreams of the lake known as the Selenter See. At its outlet into the Salzau near the district Fargau of Fargau-Pratjau, the water level of the lake can be controlled. On its way to the Baltic Sea it flows into the Passader See. It leaves this as the Hagener Au, which after the last few metres discharges into the Baltic between Laboe and Stein.

Origin of the name 
The Salzau gives its name to the village of Salzau in the municipality of Fargau-Pratjau, whose manor house  was called Schloss Salzau (Salzau Castle) locally and now houses the Salzau state cultural centre.

See also 
List of rivers of Schleswig-Holstein

References

External links 
 Kurd-Ulrich Günther: Hydrobiologische Studien an vier kleineren Fließgewässern in Schleswig-Holstein (Salzau, Hüttener Au, Kossau und Osterau) (pdf file: 2.1 MB)

Plön (district)
Rivers of Schleswig-Holstein
1Salzau
Rivers of Germany